The Tiger Brigades is a 2006 French crime film. Based on a very successful 1970s-'80s French television series of the same name the film depicts an Untouchables-type crack "Flying Squad" once formed by Georges Clemenceau to tackle rampant crime in 1912 Paris. The squads became known to the public as "Tiger Brigades", after Clemenceau's nickname "Le Tigre", and were among the first police units to be equipped with automobiles, telephones, telegraphs and seriously trained in French boxing and Canne de combat.

Gathering a talented pan-European cast, the film is set in the vibrant Belle Époque and deals with a lot of real historical plots and characters like the scandal of the Russian Loans, the Triple Entente, the birth of modern profiling and crime-fighting police techniques, international police cooperation, the new rivalry between Louis Lépine's PP (Paris Police Prefecture) Brigade Criminelle and Clémenceau's Brigade Mobile (ancestors of the current Central Directorate of the Judicial Police), the birth of Socialism and famous Anarchist Movements.

Plot
Valentin and his squad of Mobilards are assigned to track down the infamous Bonnot Gang.

Cast
Clovis Cornillac as Commissaire Valentin 
Diane Kruger as Constance Bolkonsky 
Édouard Baer as Inspector Pujol 
Olivier Gourmet as Inspecteur Marcel Terrasson 
Stefano Accorsi as Achille Bianchi 
Jacques Gamblin as Jules Bonnot 
Thierry Frémont as Piotr 
Léa Drucker as Léa 
Aleksandr Medvedev as Prince Bolkonsky
Gérard Jugnot as Claude Faivre
Agnès Soral as Mademoiselle Amélie
Éric Prat as Alphonse Bertillon
Didier Flamand as Louis Lépine
Philippe Duquesne as Casimir Cagne
Frédéric Bouraly as Caby
Mathias Mlekuz as Célestin Hennion
Nicholas Calderbank as Hollingworth
Roland Cope as Raymond Poincaré

TV serial
Les Brigades du Tigre is also the name of a French TV serial, produced between 1974 and 1983.

References

External links
 
 

2006 films
Films set in 1912
Films set in Paris
2000s crime films
Biographical films about French gangsters
French crime films
Films based on television series
Belle Époque
2000s French films